Thomas Pury (1619 – 1693) was an English politician who sat in the House of Commons from 1640 to 1653. He supported the Parliamentarian cause in the English Civil War.

History
Pury was the son of  Thomas Pury of Gloucestershire. He matriculated at Magdalen Hall, Oxford on 18 November 1635 aged 16. He was admitted at Grays Inn on 29 January  1641. He was employed by Mr Townshend of Staples Inn in 1642 and was receiver of King's rents in Gloucestershire and Wiltshire. He was clerk of peace for Gloucestershire and Captain of foot and horse in the parliamentary army.

In December 1646, Pury was elected Member of Parliament for Monmouth Boroughs in the Long Parliament.  He survived Pride's Purge and sat in the Rump Parliament.

Pury died at the age of 73.

Pury married Barbara Kyrle daughter of James Kyrle of Walford.

References

 

1619 births
1683 deaths
English MPs 1640–1648
English MPs 1648–1653
English MPs 1659
Roundheads